Silvermines, historically known as Bellagowan, is a village in County Tipperary in Ireland. It lies immediately north of the Silvermine mountain range and takes its name from the extensive mines of lead, zinc, copper, baryte and silver nearby. Towards the very south of the Silvermine Mountains is the highest peak in the mountains,  Keeper Hill or in Irish Sliabh Cimeálta, which rises to 695m, dominating the area. Silvermines is located near the town of Nenagh on the R499 regional road. It is a parish in the Roman Catholic Diocese of Killaloe and is also in the historical barony of Ormond Upper.

Mining heritage

The earliest record of mining in the district is from 1289, but was short-lived.  Mining resumed in the 17th century and continued intermittently until 1874. It restarted in 1949, and shortly after a world-class deposit of baryte was found and opencast mining of this began in 1963 by Magcobar (Ireland) Ltd.  Soon after a multi-million-tonne orebody grading about 11% combined lead and zinc was also discovered.  This was worked underground from 1968 to 1982 by Mogul of Ireland Ltd.  The Magcobar mine closed in September 1992, and its extensive spoil heaps are a prominent local landmark, visible for miles.  The Mogul mine became famous for the many fine mineral specimens it produced, particularly of the ore minerals galena and sphalerite.

The Old Smelting House, now a ruin, is listed as a protected structure by Tipperary County Council (RPS Ref S477).

Recently, the area has come to media attention as the integrity of the village's water supply was threatened by pollution from the tailings left behind at the mine.

Transport
Freight trains no longer serve Silvermines.

Bus Éireann route 323 from Newport, County Tipperary to Nenagh serves the village on Fridays-only. There is a journey at 11.00 am to Nenagh. This returns from Nenagh railway station at 1.45 pm, serving the village at 2.05 pm and continuing to Newport.

Slieve Felim Way
It is designated as a National Waymarked Trail by the National Trails Office of the Irish Sports Council and is managed by Shannon Development and Coillte.

See also
 List of mountains in Ireland
 List of towns and villages in Ireland

References

Parishes of the Roman Catholic Diocese of Killaloe
Towns and villages in County Tipperary